The Creeping, is a 2022 British horror film directed by Jamie Hooper, starring Riann Steele and Jane Lowe.

Cast
Riann Steele as Anna Reynolds
Taliyah Blair as Young Anna
Jane Lowe as Lucy Blakely
Jonathan Nyati as Harry Reynolds

Release
The film premiered at Panic Fest on 1 May 2022.

Reception
Michelle Swope of the Daily Dead rated the film 3.5 stars out of 5, writing "Boasting a great cast and marvelous nostalgic scares, The Creeping skillfully succeeds at telling a spellbinding and frightening ghost story." Chad Collins of Dread Central rated the film 3 stars out of 5, calling it "a delightful, throwback ghost story that perhaps leans too heavily on its haunted past." John Dotson of GameRant rated the film 3 stars out of 5. The film received positive reviews in Horror Obsessive and Screen Zealots.

References

External links
 
 

British horror films
2022 horror films